This is a list of individuals who are natives of, or are notable in association with, the city of Birmingham, Alabama.

Academia
 Monnie T. Cheves, Samford University professor; member of the Louisiana House of Representatives from 1952 to 1960; died in Birmingham in 1988
 Frank Moore Cross, religious scholar
 Angela Davis, social activist and author
 Richard Nelson Frye, scholar of Iran and Central Asia
 Roland Frye, scholar
 Carol Garrison, ex-president of University of Alabama at Birmingham
 Zenkei Blanche Hartman, first abbess of the San Francisco Zen Center
 Freeman Hrabowski III, educator
 Herman H. Long, president of Talladega College and United Negro College Fund
 J. Gordon Melton, religious scholar
 Emil Wolfgang Menzel, Jr. Emeritus Professor in psychology
 Edward Taub, behavioral neuroscientist and professor at the University of Alabama at Birmingham
 Julia Tutwiler, educator and social reformer

Arts and literature
 Allen Barra, journalist, sportswriter
 John Beecher, activist poet
 Edgar Peters Bowron, art historian
 Joe David Brown, journalist, novelist
 Mark Childress, author
 Jon Coffelt, artist
 Clayton Colvin, artist
 Dennis Covington, journalist, writer
 George R. Ellis, author, art historian and director of Honolulu Academy of Arts 
 Fannie Flagg, author
 Charles Gaines, novelist, screenwriter
 Charles Ghigna, poet, children's author
 Christopher Gilbert, poet
 Gail Godwin, novelist
 John Green, author
 Joe Hilley, novelist
 Caitlín R. Kiernan, novelist and paleontologist
 Kerry James Marshall, artist
 Harold E. Martin, Pulitzer Prize-winning newspaperman
 Spider Martin, photojournalist
 Robert R. McCammon, novelist
 Kevin McGowin, novelist, reviewer
 Diane McWhorter, Pulitzer Prize-winning author
 Walker Percy, author
 Howell Raines, New York Times editor
 James Redfield, novelist
 John Rhoden, sculptor
 Sonia Sanchez, poet
 Rowland Scherman, Grammy-award-winning photographer
 Melissa Springer, photographer
 Ann Waldron, author
 Margaret Walker, poet and author
 Daniel Wallace, novelist
 Mary Ware (1828 –1915), poet, prose writer
 John Weld, newspaper reporter, writer, Hollywood stunt man
 Tobias Wolff, author

Business and economics
 Cynthia Bathurst, animal rights activist, former mathematical analyst, founder/director of Safe Humane Chicago and Court Case Dog Program
 Ashton B. Collins, Sr., inventor, creator of Reddy Kilowatt
 Newton Collins, businessman and community builder
 Samuel DiPiazza, former chairman and chief executive officer of PricewaterhouseCoopers
 A. G. Gaston, African-American businessman
 Franklin Potts Glass, Sr., newspaper editor
 Jay Grinney, president and chief executive officer of HealthSouth Corporation
 John M. Harbert, billionaire and founder of Harbert Corporation
 Elmer Harris, chief executive officer of Alabama Power
 Ron Holt, CEO and founder of Two Maids & A Mop
 Charles Linn, founder of First National Bank of Birmingham (AmSouth Bancorporation)
 Don Logan, chief executive officer of Time Inc.; chairman of Warner Media; chief executive officer of Southern Progress, owner of Birmingham Barons baseball team
 Michael K. Powell, Federal Communications Commission chairman
 Rufus N. Rhodes, founder of Birmingham News
 Richard M. Scrushy, founder and former CEO of HealthSouth Corporation
 James Sloss, industrialist and founder of Sloss Furnaces
 Alvin Vogtle, chairman and CEO of Alabama Power and Southern Company
 Allen Harvey Woodward, industrialist and baseball team owner

Entertainment
 Mary Anderson, actress
 R. G. Armstrong, actor (Pleasant Grove, Alabama) 
 Mary Badham, juvenile actress
 Candace Bailey, actress
 Amber Benson, actress
 Anna Lee Carroll, actress
 Lynne Carver, actress
 Nell Carter, actress and singer
 Courteney Cox, actress (Mountain Brook, Alabama) 
 Paul Finebaum, radio/TV personality
 Jordan Fisher, actor, singer, and dancer
 Fannie Flagg, author, actress
 Louise Fletcher, actress
 David F. Friedman, director and producer
 Lili Gentle, actress
 Betty Lou Gerson, actress
 Gladys Gillem, wrestler
 Walton Goggins, actor
 Hank Green, Internet personality, podcaster
 Alan Hunter, MTV VJ
 Tamisha Iman, drag queen
 Kate Jackson, actress 
 Jasika Nicole, actress, illustrator
 Gail Patrick, actress, television producer
 Ibrehem Rahman, Survivor: Palau contestant
 Rick and Bubba, radio/TV personalities
 Wayne Rogers, actor 
 Dorothy Sebastian, film actress
 Daniel Scheinert, music video and film director
 Glenn Shadix, actor (Bessemer, Alabama)
 Rickey Smiley, radio personality
 Trinity the Tuck, drag queen
 Roy Wood, Jr., comedian
 Byron York, conservative author and journalist
 Tom York, television personality
David Jaffe, video game designer (God of War (franchise) and Twisted Metal)

Music
 Inez Andrews, gospel singer
 Barry Beckett, pianist and record producer
 Adolphus Bell, electric blues musician, best known as a one-man band
 Benny Benjamin, drummer
 Samm Bennett, singer-songwriter, multi-instrumentalist
 Bo Bice, singer, American Idol runner-up (Helena, Alabama)
 Helvetia Boswell, singer with The Boswell Sisters
 Piney Brown, R&B and blues singer-songwriter
 Oteil Burbridge, bassist
 Dorothy Love Coates, gospel singer
 J.R. Cobb, songwriter and guitarist 
 Sam Dees, soul music singer
 Diana DeGarmo, American Idol 3rd season runner-up
 Big Joe Duskin, blues pianist
 Dennis Edwards, soul music singer
 Erra, progressive metalcore band
 Al Gallodoro, jazz saxophonist and clarinetist
 Gucci Mane, rapper
 Hardrock Gunter, rockabilly pioneer
 Lionel Hampton, vibraphonist and bandleader
 Emmylou Harris, singer
 Erskine Hawkins, composer, trumpeter and bandleader
 Haywood Henry, jazz saxophonist / clarinetist
 Taylor Hicks, soul music singer, American Idol winner
 Odetta Holmes, folk singer
 Jo Jones, jazz drummer
 Bill Justis, musician
 Eddie Kendricks, soul music singer
 William King, singer, founding member of The Commodores
 Baker Knight, songwriter and bandleader
 Sammy Lowe, jazz trumpeter and arranger
 Rebecca Luker, Broadway singer, actress
 Hugh Martin, songwriter and film composer
 Maylene and the Sons of Disaster, Southern rock/metalcore band
 Johnny O'Neal, jazz pianist
 Avery Parrish, composer and jazz pianist
 Hank Penny, Western swing musician
 Ray Reach, jazz vocalist and pianist
 St. Paul and The Broken Bones, neo soul band
 Dan Sartain, rock musician 
 Johnny Smith, jazz guitarist
 Ruben Studdard, singer, American Idol winner
 Sun Ra, jazz composer and bandleader
 Maria Taylor, singer
 Through the Sparks, indie rock band
 Verbena, indie rock band
 Wild Sweet Orange, indie rock band
 Paul Williams, soul singer
 Tammy Wynette, country singer
 YBN Nahmir (Nick Simmons), rap/hip hop artist
 Jerry Yester, singer

Government, law and politics
 Arthur Alber, Los Angeles City Council member, 1927–29
 John Amari, District 10 Circuit Court judge, former member of both houses of the Alabama State Legislature 
 Douglas Arant, attorney and co-founder of Bradley Arant Boult & Cummings
 Richard Arrington, first African-American mayor of Birmingham
 B. B. Comer, former governor of Alabama
 Eugene "Bull" Connor, former Commissioner of Public Safety
 Hugh Culverhouse, lawyer and owner of Tampa Bay Buccaneers
 Russell McWhortor Cunningham, Governor of Alabama
 Mike Fair, Oklahoma state legislator
 John Grenier, Republican politician in Alabama
 Art Hanes, mayor of Birmingham
 Gil Hill, Detroit, Michigan city council president and actor
 Perry O. Hooper, Sr., 27th chief justice of the Alabama Supreme Court; born in Birmingham in 1925; resided in adult life in Montgomery
 Bernard Kincaid, mayor of Birmingham
 Michael Landsberry, Marine and math teacher
 Raymond Lee Lathan, Wisconsin state legislator
 Chris McNair, Alabama state legislator and businessman
 Bert Nettles, lawyer in Birmingham; Republican member of the Alabama House of Representatives from Mobile (1969-1974)
 Charles Redding Pitt, chairman of Alabama Democratic Party
 Cecil F. Poole, federal judge,  U.S. Court of Appeals for Ninth Circuit
 Condoleezza Rice, United States Secretary of State
 George G. Siebels, Jr., first Republican to serve as mayor of Birmingham (1967-1975)
 Luther Strange, Attorney General of Alabama  2011-2017 and former Senator of Alabama, born in Birmingham
 Margaret Tutwiler, diplomat
 Robert S. Vance, chairman of Democratic Party, plaintiff's lawyer, federal judge United States Court of Appeals for the Eleventh Circuit

United States Senate
 Hugo Black (1927–1937), also Supreme Court Justice (1937–1971)
 B. B. Comer (1920), also Governor of Alabama (1907–1911)
 Joseph Forney Johnston (1907–1913)
 Doug Jones (2018–2021)
 Richard Shelby (1987–present)
 Luther Strange (2017–2018)
 Oscar W. Underwood (1915–1927)
 Francis S. White (1914–1915)

United States House of Representatives
 Truman H. Aldrich (Alabama's 8th congressional district, 1896)
 Spencer Bachus (6th District, 1993–2015)
 John H. Bankhead (6th District, 1887–1907)
 Laurie C. Battle (9th District, 1947–1955)
 Sydney J. Bowie
 John H. Buchanan, Jr. (6th District, 1965–1981)
 Reuben Chapman (6th District, 1843–1847)
 Newton Nash Clements (6th District, 1880–1881)
 Williamson Robert Winfield Cobb (6th District, 1847–1861)
 Artur Davis (7th District, 1982–1992)
 Edward deGraffenried (6th District, 1949–1953)
 William Henry Denson (7th District, 1893–1895)
 Jack Edwards (1st District, 1965–1985)
 Ben Erdreich (6th District, 1983–1993)
 Claude Harris, Jr. (7th District, 1987–1993)
 Thomas Haughey (6th District, 1867–1869)
 Goldsmith W. Hewitt (6th District, 1876–1879, 1881–1885)
 Earl F. Hilliard (7th District, 1993–2003)
 Richmond P. Hobson (6th District, 1907–1915)
 George Huddleston (9th District, 1913–1935)
 George Huddleston, Jr. (9th District, 1955–1963)
 Pete Jarman (6th District, 1937–1949)
 Burwell Boykin Lewis (6th District, 1879–1880)
Elaine Luria (VA 2nd District, 2019–present), and former United States Navy Commander
 John Mason Martin (6th District, 1885–1887)
 John P. Newsome (9th District, 1943–1945)
 William B. Oliver (6th District, 1915–1937)
 Luther Patrick (9th District, 1935–1943, 1945–1947)
 Armistead I. Selden, Jr. (6th District, 1953–1965)
 Terri Sewell (7th district, 2011–present)
 Richard Shelby (7th District, 1979–1987)
 William Crawford Sherrod (6th District, 1869–1871)
 Joseph Humphrey Sloss (6th District, 1871–1875)
 Albert L. Smith, Jr. (6th District, 1981–1983)
 Jesse F. Stallings
 Louis Washington Turpin (9th District, 1893–1895)
 Oscar W. Underwood (8th District, 1895–1896; 9th District 1897–1915)

Math, science, and technology
 Mary Anderson, inventor of windshield wipers
 Andrew Jackson Beard, inventor of automatic railcar coupling
 Edward M. Burgess, chemist and inventor of the Burgess reagent
 Lawrence J. DeLucas, biophysical engineer; Space Shuttle Columbia astronaut
Annie Easley, mathematician and rocket scientist
 Clyde Foster, scientist and mathematician
 E. O. Wilson, entomologist and author

Medicine
 James Andrews, orthopedic specialist
 Tinsley Harrison, editor of first five editions of Harrison's Principals of Internal Medicine, dean of UAB School of Medicine
 Alan Heldman, interventional cardiologist and pioneer of the drug eluting stent
 John W. Kirklin, heart surgeon
 Larry Lemak, orthopedic surgeon, owner of the Lemak Group
 Albert Pacifico, heart surgeon
 Michael Saag, AIDS researcher
 Luther Leonidas Terry, Surgeon General of the United States

Sports
Mario Addison, NFL player
Mike Anderson, University of Arkansas men's basketball coach
Jay Barker, football player, college and pro quarterback
Charles Barkley, basketball player, Hall of Famer and TV personality (Leeds, Alabama)
Gene Bartow, basketball coach and athletic director for UAB
Bruce Benedict, born in Birmingham, Major League Baseball player
Cornelius Bennett, NFL Pro-Bowler
Eric Bledsoe, basketball player for the New Orleans Pelicans
Neil Bonnett, born in Birmingham, Hall of Fame NASCAR driver, TV personality
Th-resa Bostick, born in Birmingham, IFBB professional bodybuilder
Lyman Bostock, born in Birmingham, Major League Baseball player
Bobby Bowden, football coach
Debbie Bramwell-Washington, IFBB professional bodybuilder
Levert Carr, football player
Bubba Church, born in Birmingham, Major League Baseball player
Jared Cook, born in Birmingham, football player, tight end
Ted Cook, football player
Jerricho Cotchery, football player, Pittsburgh Steelers wide receiver
Ed Daniel (born 1990), basketball player who plays for Israeli team Maccabi Ashdod
Karlos Dansby, football player
Marcell Dareus, football player for Buffalo Bills
A. J. Davis, NFL player
Mike Davis, UAB basketball coach
Spud Davis, born in Birmingham, Major League Baseball player
Tom Drake, born in Birmingham, Major League Baseball player
Vonetta Flowers, bobsledder, Olympic gold medalist
Vince Gibson, football coach
Harry Gilmer, football player
Alex Grammas, born in Birmingham, Major League Baseball player
Hubie Green, professional golfer
Jerry Hairston, Sr., born in Birmingham, Major League Baseball player
Samuel H. Hairston, baseball player
Darrin Hancock, NBA player 
Trey Hardee, NCAA Division I track and field collegiate heptathlon and decathlon record holder, Olympian
Walt Harris, MMA fighter
Chandler Hoffman, born in Birmingham, United Soccer League player
Bobby Humphrey, football player, Alabama and NFL
Bo Jackson, 1985 Heisman Trophy winner, multi-sport athlete
Ron Jackson, born in Birmingham, Major League Baseball player
Desmond Jennings, baseball player
Ken Jordan, football player
Smylie Kaufman, golfer
Larry Kenon, born in Birmingham, basketball player
Corey Kluber, Major League Baseball pitcher, Cy Young Award winner
Carl Lewis, born in Birmingham, multiple Olympic gold-medalist and world champion track-and-field athlete
Theodore Long, General Manager of WWE Smackdown
Larry Mason (American football), football player
Lee May, born in Birmingham, Major League Baseball player
Willie Mays, Major League Baseball player, Hall of Famer
KJ McDaniels, NBA player
Larry McReynolds, announcer for NASCAR on FOX
Charlie Moore, baseball player
Tony Nathan, football player and coach
Gus Niarhos, born in Birmingham, Major League Baseball player
Satchel Paige, Major League Baseball player
Sam Raben (born 1997), soccer player
Chris Richards, born in Birmingham, professional soccer player for Crystal Palace of the English Premier League and the United States national team
David Robertson, Major League Baseball player
Erk Russell, football player
Ed Salem,  football player and Birmingham restaurateur
Jason Standridge, Major League Baseball player
Ronald Steele, basketball player
Rebel Steiner, football player
Picabo Street, downhill skier, Olympic gold medalist
Pat Sullivan, 1971 Heisman Trophy winner and former head football coach at Samford University
Dabo Swinney, born in Birmingham, Clemson University head football coach
Bryan Thomas, born in Birmingham, linebacker for New York Jets, graduated from Minor High School
Dan Thomas, Major League Baseball player for Milwaukee Brewers
Andre Tippett, NFL Hall of Fame linebacker
Tommy Tolleson, NFL player
Virgil Trucks, born in Birmingham, Major League Baseball player
Bob Veale, born in Birmingham, Major League Baseball player
Dixie Walker, Major League Baseball player
Peahead Walker, born in Birmingham, football coach
Adam Warren, Major League Baseball pitcher
Chris Woods, American player of gridiron football
Al Worthington, born in Birmingham, Major League Baseball player
John Zimmerman, professional pairs figure skater

Other
 Mel Allen, radio and TV sports personality, primary play-by-play announcer for New York Yankees
 Mother Angelica, nun and founder of global Catholic network EWTN
 Robert Joseph Baker, Bishop of the Catholic Diocese of Birmingham
 Donald Beatty, aviator, explorer and inventor
 Angela Davis, activist
 Deidre Downs, Miss America 2005
 Samantha Francis, contestant on America's Next Top Model, Cycle 8
 Victor Gold, journalist, formerly with The Birmingham News
 Hank Green, YouTube blogger, musician and entrepreneur
 Lola Hendricks, civil rights activist
 Patti Ruffner Jacobs, suffragist and social reformer
 James Meissner, World War I flying ace
 Artemus Ogletree, victim of 1935 unsolved murder in Kansas City
 Joseph Raya, archbishop and social activist
 Wallace Rayfield, architect
 Sonia Sanchez, poet, activist, and educator
 Jay Sebring, hair stylist, Charles Manson victim, ex-boyfriend of Sharon Tate
 Courtney Shropshire, founder of Civitan International
 Fred Shuttlesworth, civil rights activist
 Haleigh Stidham, Miss Alabama USA 2006
 Heather Whitestone, Miss America 1995
 Louise Wooster, famed madam

See also
List of people from Alabama

References

Birmingham Alabama

Birmingham
people